Jangheung Im clan is one of the Korean clans. Their Bon-gwan is in Jangheung County, South Jeolla Province. According to the research in 2015, the number of Jangheung Im (or Yim) clan was 37,584.

Goryeo Dynasty 
Their founder is Im Ho (Hangul: 임호, Hanja: 任顥) who settled in Jangheung. His son Im Ui (Hangul: 임의, Hanja: 任懿) became the highest-ranking government officer (Hangul: 중서문하평장사, Hanja: 中書門下平章事) under King Yejong of Goryeo and was the grandfather of Queen Gongye. He also became Duke of Jangheung region that back then included the current Jangheung County and large parts of some adjacent counties, such as Boseong, Suncheon, Haenam, Goheung, and Gangjin.

During the Goryeo dynasty, Jangheung Im clan produced three prime ministers (Hangul: 삼중대광 정1품 품계, Hangja: 三重大匡 文官) and many minister-level officers. Jangheung Im was one of the ten clans who were allowed to marry the King's family members. For example, Queen Gongye is from the Jangheung Im clan and three of her sons became kings of the Goryeo dynasty. They are King Uijong of Goryeo, King Myeongjong of Goryeo, and King Sinjong of Goryeo.

Joseon Dynasty 
Because Jangheung Im clan had such a close relationship with the royal family of Goryeo dynasty, Jangheung Im clan avoided government officer positions during the first 200 years of Joseon dynasty. Later when Joseon dynasty suffered from various internal and external events, some members of Jangheung Im clan started to help the regime by becoming generals, mayors, and righteous army leaders. Some of them (e.g., Im Gye-young) fought against foreign armies when they invade. Some others were scholars. For example, Im Hui-jong (Hangul: 임희중, Hanja: 任希重) founded a school and taught many students. One of his books is now kept in the UC Berkeley East Asia library.

Republic of Korea 
Jangheung Im clan produced a Korean war hero, General Im Chung-shik, who served as a national defense minister, a former minister of agriculture, Dr. Im Sang-gyu, and a politician, Im Jong-seok. As well as some other various parliament members, high-rank government officers, mayors, lawyers, and scholars.

References